Acid orange 19 is an azo dye that is used to color polyamide and wool fibers.

References

Azo dyes
2-Naphthols